The 1986 edition of the Campeonato Carioca kicked off on February 16, 1986 and ended on August 10, 1986. It is the official tournament organized by FFERJ (Federação de Futebol do Estado do Rio de Janeiro, or Rio de Janeiro State Football Federation. Only clubs based in the Rio de Janeiro State are allowed to play. Twelve teams contested this edition. Flamengo won the title for the 22nd time. no teams were relegated.

System
The tournament would be divided in three stages:
 Taça Guanabara: The twelve teams all played in a single round-robin format against each other. The champions qualified to the final phase. 
 Taça Rio: The twelve teams all played in a single round-robin format against each other. The champions qualified to the final phase.
 Final phase: The champions of the two stages, plus the team with the best overall record would play that phase. in case three different teams qualified, each team played in a single round-robin format against each other and the team with the most points won the title. in case the same team won one of the states and was the team with the best record, they would hold a three-match final series against the other stage winner.

Championship

Taça Guanabara

Taça Rio

Aggregate table

Finals

References

Campeonato Carioca seasons
Carioca